Bermary Altagracia Polanco Muñoz (born 7 August 1999) is a Dominican Republic badminton player She competed at the 2015 Pan American Games in Toronto, Canada.

Achievements

BWF International Challenge/Series 
Women's doubles

Mixed doubles

  BWF International Challenge tournament
  BWF International Series tournament
  BWF Future Series tournament

References

External links 
 

1999 births
Living people
Dominican Republic female badminton players
Badminton players at the 2015 Pan American Games
Badminton players at the 2019 Pan American Games
Pan American Games competitors for the Dominican Republic
Competitors at the 2014 Central American and Caribbean Games
Competitors at the 2018 Central American and Caribbean Games
21st-century Dominican Republic women